Major-General Brian Thomas Pennicott, CVO (born 15 February 1938) is a former senior British Army officer who served as Defence Services Secretary from 1991 to 1994.

Military career
Educated at Portsmouth Northern Grammar School and the Royal Military Academy Sandhurst, Pennicott was commissioned into the Royal Artillery in 1957. He became Commanding Officer of 29 Commando Regiment RA in 1977 and then joined the staff of the Military Secretary at the Ministry of Defence in 1980. He was Commander, Royal Artillery forces during the Falklands War and, as a witness, signed the Argentine surrender document. He went on to be Assistant Military Attaché in Washington D. C. in 1982, Commander, Royal Artillery for 1st Armoured Division in 1983 and Deputy Military Secretary in 1987 before being appointed Director, Royal Artillery in 1989. He was Defence Services Secretary from 1991 to 1994 as well as Assistant Chief of Defence Staff (Personnel and Reserves) from 1992 to 1994.

In retirement he became Group Human Resources Director at Sun Alliance. He was also appointed as a Gentleman Usher and was present at the funeral of the Queen Mother. Pennicott retired from this position at the end of 2007, though he was then moved to a position of being the Extra Gentleman Usher.

Family
In 1962 he married Patricia Anne Chilcott; they have two sons and three daughters.

References

 

British Army generals
Commanders of the Royal Victorian Order
British Army personnel of the Falklands War
Royal Artillery officers
Living people
1938 births